Poecilia mexicana, commonly known as the shortfin molly or Atlantic molly, is a species of poeciliid fish native to fresh and brackish water in Mexico and Guatemala. One population is found in caves and known as the cave molly.

Description
It typically grows to a total length .

Distribution and habitat
The fish lives in tropical freshwater and brackish water habitats. The shortfin molly is considered benthopelagic. It lives in a pH range between 7.0 and 7.5 at temperatures between 22 and 28 degrees Celsius. The species does not migrate. It is an invasive species in the Muddy River of Nevada, USA.

Ecology

Speciation
In two case studies in Cueva del Azufre and Cueva Luna Azufre in Tabasco, Mexico, the Atlantic molly is experiencing speciation. It is occurring between cave and surface populations as well as between habitats of varying sulfur concentrations.

Human significance
The fishing industry has no interest in harvesting the species. However, it is sold commercially for aquariums. Occasionally, the shortfin molly is used as bait.

Etymology, taxonomy, and history
Franz Steindachner first described the species in 1863. Poecilia refers to the Greek word poikilos, which means "with a lot of colours". Common names include "shortfin molly" and "Atlantic molly." The type specimen was found in Orizaba, Mexico.

References

External links

mexicana
Taxa named by Franz Steindachner
Fish described in 1863